Dána-Ain Davis is a professor of urban studies at Queens College, City University of New York (CUNY) and the Director of the Center for the Study of Women and Society.

Biography 
Davis was born in New York. After college, she worked at the Village Voice and then went into the non-profit world, working at the YWCA of the City of New York, WNYC-TV, The Village Centers for Care, and Bronx AIDS Services. Davis received her PhD in Anthropology at The Graduate Center, CUNY.

Davis is the co-editor of Feminist Anthropology, the first journal from the Association of Feminist Anthropology (AFA).  Davis is on the editorial board for CA (Cultural Anthropology), WSQ (Women's Studies Quarterly). In 2018, Davis was appointed as a Taskforce Member in Governor Cuomo's Maternal/Mortality Task Force.

Publications 

 Reproductive Injustice: Racism, Pregnancy, and Premature Birth. New York: NYU Press, 2019. .
 Feminist Ethnography: Thinking Through Methodologies, Challenges & Possibilities. Dána-Ain Davis and Crista Craven. Lanham, MD; Rowman & Littlefield, 2016. .
 Feminist Activist Ethnography: Counterpoints to Neoliberalism in North America. Edited Collection, Christa Craven & Dána-Ain Davis, eds. Lanham, MD: Lexington Books, 2013. .
 Black Genders and Sexualities. Edited collection, Shaka McGlotten and Dána-Ain Davis, eds. New York: Palgrave McMillan, 2012. .
 Battered Black Women and Welfare Reform: Between a Rock and a Hard Place. Albany, NY: SUNY Press, 2006. .

References

Year of birth missing (living people)
Living people
City University of New York alumni
City University of New York faculty